Stuart Palmer may refer to:

Stuart Palmer (author) (1905–1968), American writer
Stuart Palmer (footballer) (born 1951), Australian rules footballer
Stuart Palmer (physicist), English physicist